Mason Singer Aguirre (born November 10, 1987 in Duluth, Minnesota) is an American snowboarder. He competes in halfpipe,  slopestyle and superpipe, but consistently places higher in halfpipe and superpipe competitions. He competed in the men's halfpipe event at the 2006 Winter Olympics.

Career
Aguirre spent his childhood growing up in Duluth where he followed his older brother, Tyler Aguirre, onto the slopes when Mason was six. He turned pro at fifteen and his parents moved their family to Mammoth Lakes, California to pursue his snowboarding career.  In 2006, Aguirre became the youngest  snowboarder on  the U.S. Olympic Snowboarding Team by beating out Ross Powers, 2002 Halfpipe gold medalist and J.J. Thomas, 2002 Halfpipe bronze medalist.  Aguirre’s first trip to the Olympics was successful, placing 4th overall in the Halfpipe event. Aguirre placed first overall at the 2006 World Superpipe Championships and again at the 2006 Burton New Zealand Open. Aguirre also played baseball during his childhood, pitching a complete game and hitting a grand slam in the same championship game.

He is currently sponsored by Nike and D Howlett Boards, K2 Snowboards, Smith Optics, SoBe, DVS, Windells, Fender Guitars, Mammoth Mountain, Val Surf, The Collection, and R.E.D. Protection.

Frends Crew
Aguirre is a member of the Frends Crew (spelled without the "i" to emphasize the collective nature of the group) made up of snowboarders Kevin Pearce, Danny Davis, Mikkel Bang, Scotty Lago, Keir Dillon, Jack Mitrani, Luke Mitrani, Eric Jackson, and the Swartz Brothers. Frends is group of riders who turned their initial friendship into a formal alliance in 2007 to move the sport away from its recent competitive and business focus and return the sport to its grass roots, collegial beginnings.

Style
Known for his aggressive yet smooth riding style, Aguirre regularly pulls off 1080s, 900s and is known for his corkscrewed 540.  Another thing that sets him apart from the field is his unusual stature.  He stands out of the snowboarding crowd because most snowboarders are more compact making it easy for them to rotate and twist in mid air, while he is a lanky 5’11", weighing only 150lbs.  However, he has shown no signs of this affecting his mid air maneuvers.

Personal life
He enjoys playing guitar and golf. One of his favorite things to do while trying out different mountains is make videos and have film shoots. His favorite mountain is Mammoth, California.

His sister Molly Aguirre is also a professional snowboarder sponsored by DC.

References

External links
Mason's Olympic Bio
Mason Aguirre Interview
Mason Aguirre Interview at the World Superpipe Championships
EXPN Bio
USOC Bio
A Mason Aguirre fansite
Aguirre's Rider Profile & Results on ttrworldtour.com

1987 births
Living people
American male snowboarders
Sportspeople from Duluth, Minnesota
X Games athletes
People from Duluth, Minnesota
People from Mammoth Lakes, California
Olympic snowboarders of the United States
Snowboarders at the 2006 Winter Olympics
20th-century American people
21st-century American people